Bascom is a census-designated place in western Hopewell Township, Seneca County, Ohio. It has a post office with the ZIP code 44809 and hosts Hopewell-Loudon High School. The community is located at the intersection of State Routes 18 and 635 east of Fostoria.

Demographics

History
Bascom was laid out in 1837. The community derives its name from Scott & Bascom, publishers of The Ohio State Journal. A post office called Bascom has been in operation since 1850.

References

External links

Census-designated places in Ohio
Census-designated places in Seneca County, Ohio